Tee-Set was a pop rock band formed in 1965 by singer Peter Tetteroo in Delft, Netherlands. The band is best-known for their single "Ma Belle Amie", which was a No. 5 hit in the United States and No. 3 in Canada.

The band had a number of other hit songs in the Netherlands, including the number one song "She Likes Weeds". The band underwent numerous changes in its members; the only constant was its lead singer Peter Tetteroo, who died in September 2002 at the age of 55.

History
The band was formed in 1965 in Delft, Netherlands by singer . Other early members were Gerard Romeyn on guitar, Polle Eduard on bass, Carry Janssen on drums, and Robbie Plazier on keyboard. Their first single released in 1966 on the Delta label, "Early in the Morning", was successful in The Netherlands. The band had a top 10 hit "Don't You Leave" the same year, selling 10,000 copies in its first week of release. The band underwent numerous changes in its line-up though the years; the keyboardist  joined in 1966, replacing  Robbie Plazier. Romeyn, Eduard and Janssen left, to be replaced Ray Fenwick on guitar, Franklin Madjid on bass, and Joop Blom on drums.  Van Eijck also left and was replaced by Jan-Pieter Boekhoorn on keyboard (Van Eijck later returned in 1969). Fenwick then left and later reappeared in The Spencer Davis Group. He was replaced by Ferdi Karmelk. Dihl Bennink also joined the band. In 1969, Tetteroo founded their own label Tee Set Records.

The group recorded a single in 1969 titled "Ma Belle Amie", which was a hit in their native country, selling over 100,000 copies. The group released an album in the United States on Colossus Records in 1970 titled Ma Belle Amie (the single of the same name listing the artist as 'The Tee Set'), which reached No. 158 on the Billboard 200 chart, just as the single took off in the United States, eventually reaching No. 5. The single sold over 1 million copies, and was awarded a gold disc. The version of "Ma Belle Amie" released in 1970 on Major Minor records in the UK is a different studio version of the song, slower in tempo and beginning in a lower key than the hit U.S. version. 

In the Netherlands, Tee Set's single "She Likes Weeds" reached No. 1 on the Dutch charts. However, the track was banned in the U.S. because it was said to be referring to drug use, although the title was taken from the film Funeral in Berlin. The follow-up single "If You Do Believe in Love" hit No. 81 in the US and No. 31 in Canada. The group disbanded in 1975, but briefly reunited in 1978 and 1983. Since 1983 the band was revived, although its work was mainly nostalgic "sixties".

Members

Peter Tetteroo (vocals) (born 7 August 1947, Delft, Netherlands; died 9 September 2002 age 55)
Gerard Romeyn (guitar)
Polle Eduard (bass)
Carry Janssen (drums)
Robbie Plazier (Keyboards)
Hans Van Eijck (keyboards)
Franklin Madjid (bass guitar)
Ray Fenwick (guitar), around 1965 to 1967
Ferdi Karmelk (guitar)
Dihl Bennink (guitar, flute, banjo) (born 15 February 1948, The Hague) 1967 to 1970
Ferry Lever (guitar), from 1970 to 1979
Joop Blom (drums)
Jan-Pieter Boekhoorn (keyboards), from 1967 to 1969 
Herman van Boeyen (drums, 1970)
Henry van der Bos (keyboards)
Max Spangenberg (drums, 1970-79)
Peter Seilberger (organ, piano)

Peter Tetteroo
Peter Tetteroo (Petrus Gerardus Anthonius Tetteroo) (8 July 1947 − 9 September 2002) was a Dutch composer, pop musician and singer born in Delft. He became known in 1966 as founder and lead singer of Tee-Set. In 1968, he had a top 10 hit with a solo album, his version of Red Red Wine. Despite a severe liver disease, Peter remained active to the end. He died at his home in Delft from liver cancer at the age of 55.

Discography

Albums

Studio albums

Compilations

Singles

Notes

References

External links
 
 

Dutch musical groups
1965 establishments in the Netherlands
1979 disestablishments in the Netherlands
Musical groups established in 1965
Musical groups disestablished in 1979